Pleasant Valley is a ghost town in Lincoln County, Kansas, United States.

History
Pleasant Valley, Lincoln County, Kansas was issued a post office in 1873. The post office was discontinued in 1896.

References

Former populated places in Lincoln County, Kansas
Former populated places in Kansas